Simas Buterlevičius (born 18 April 1989) is a Lithuanian professional basketball player for Södertälje Kings of Swedish Basketball League.

Awards and achievements

 Baltic Basketball League Presidents Cup winner: 2008

References

1989 births
Living people
BC Rytas players
Lithuanian men's basketball players
Small forwards
Basketball players from Vilnius
BC Lietkabelis players